Jeffrey Outlaw Shallit (born October 17, 1957) is a computer scientist, number theorist, and a noted critic of intelligent design.  He is married to Anna Lubiw, also a computer scientist.

Early life and education 
Shallit was born in Philadelphia, Pennsylvania in 1957.  His father was Joseph Shallit, a journalist and author, and a son of Jewish immigrants from Vitebsk, Russia (now in Belarus).  His mother was Louise Lee Outlaw Shallit, a writer.  He has one brother, Jonathan Shallit, a music professor.

He earned a Bachelor's degree in mathematics from Princeton University in June 1979.  He received a Ph.D., also in mathematics, from the University of California, Berkeley in June 1983.  His doctoral thesis was entitled Metric Theory of Pierce Expansions and his advisor was Manuel Blum.

Advocacy 
Since 1996, Shallit has held the position of Vice-President of Electronic Frontier Canada.

In 1997, he gained attention for the publication on the Internet of Holocaust Revised: Lies of Our Times (also called the Shallit Report), a reprint of an article he had written for a Waterloo student publication in 1993, which detailed the backgrounds and past statements of various persons whom he accused of being Holocaust deniers, notably David Irving, Fred A. Leuchter, and Eustace Mullins.  This triggered a public exchange of letters between him and Irving.

Shallit has been a critic of the work of William Dembski promoting intelligent design.  He has coauthored a paper with Wesley Elsberry demonstrating problems with Dembski's mathematical work, and would have appeared as a witness opposing Dembski in the Kitzmiller v. Dover trial had Dembski not dropped out.

Professional life 
Shallit is currently a Professor in the School of Computer Science at the University of Waterloo and the editor-in-chief of the Journal of Integer Sequences.  His primary academic interests are combinatorics on words, formal languages, automata theory, and algorithmic number theory. He has been recognized by the Association for Computing Machinery as a Distinguished Scientist (2008).

His publications include the books Algorithmic Number Theory (with Eric Bach), a noted text on algorithms, Automatic Sequences: Theory, Applications, Generalizations (with ), and  A Second Course in Formal Languages and Automata Theory.

See also
 List of University of Waterloo people

References

External links 
Home page of Jeffrey O. Shallit
Shallit's blog, Recursivity
Electronic Frontier Canada 
Holocaust Revised: Lies of our Times 

1957 births
Living people
American computer scientists
American people of Belarusian-Jewish descent
American atheists
Critics of creationism
I. P. Sharp Associates employees
IBM employees
Scientists from Philadelphia
Number theorists
Academic staff of the University of Waterloo
Princeton University alumni
Mathematicians from Philadelphia